The 1995 Southwest Conference baseball tournament was the league's annual postseason tournament used to determine the Southwest Conference's (SWC) automatic bid to the 1995 NCAA Division I baseball tournament. The tournament was held from May 18 through 21 at Olsen Field on the main campus of Texas A&M University in College Station, Texas.

The number one seed Texas Tech Red Raiders went 3–1 to win the team's first SWC tournament under head coach Larry Hays.

Format and seeding 
The tournament featured the top four finishers of the SWC's seven teams in a double-elimination tournament.

Regular season conference champion Texas Tech received the first seed while Rice claimed the second seed by tiebreaker over Texas A&M, and Texas received the fourth seed.

Tournament

References 

Tournament
Southwest Conference Baseball Tournament
Southwest Conference baseball tournament